Riccardo Zadra is an Italian pianist.

Zadra was awarded the 1988 Sydney Competition's 2nd prize. He has performed and recorded internationally since. He is the founder of the Accademia pianistica internazionale de Padova, presided by Aldo Ciccolini, and teaches at the Vicenza Conservatory.

References
  Ministry of Education, Universities and Research

Italian classical pianists
Male classical pianists
Italian male pianists
Sydney International Piano Competition prize-winners
Living people
Year of birth missing (living people)
21st-century classical pianists
21st-century Italian male musicians